Robert Strang (30 September 1901 – 15 March 1976) was an English cricketer, a right-handed batsman who bowled right-arm medium pace.

Life 
He was born at Rainham Ledge, Hacton, Essex and educated at Whitgift School.

Strang made his debut for Berkshire in the 1924 Minor Counties Championship against Cornwall, with him making three appearances that season.  The following season, while studying at the University of Edinburgh, Strang made a single first-class appearance for Scotland against Ireland at College Park, Dublin. In Scotland's first-innings he scored 23 runs before being dismissed by Leslie Kidd, while in their second-innings he was dismissed for 11 by Jacko Heaslip. With the ball, he took the wickets of Derrick Hall and Arthur Douglas for the cost of 47 runs from 18 overs. He also appeared for Berkshire in 1925, making eight appearances, before making a single appearance in 1926 against Wiltshire.

Outside of cricket, Strang was a doctor. He died at Tylers Green, Buckinghamshire on 15 March 1976.

References

External links
Robert Strang at ESPNcricinfo
Robert Strang at CricketArchive

1901 births
1976 deaths
People from the London Borough of Havering
People educated at Whitgift School
Alumni of the University of Edinburgh
English cricketers
Berkshire cricketers
Scotland cricketers